Mark Flanagan may refer to:

 Mark Flanagan (actor), Welsh television actor
 Mark Flanagan (boxer) (born 1990), Australian boxer
 Mark Flanagan (chef), head chef to the royal household of the UK
 Mark Flanagan (communications), former head of strategic communications at 10 Downing Street, now a partner at Portland Communications
 Mark Flanagan (musician), British blues guitarist
 Mark Flanagan (rugby league) (born 1987), English rugby league player
 Mark Flanagan (rugby union) (born 1989), Irish rugby union player
 Mark Flanagan, owner of the Largo nightclub in Los Angeles
 Mark G. Flanagan (born 1963), American politician

See also
 Marc Flanagan (born 1948), American television producer and writer